Dr Jas Kohli is an Indian fictional author. His novel ‘Anything to Look Hot’ was recently published by Shristi Publishers.

Early life and personal life 
Dr Jas Kohli was born in Ludhiana, Punjab, India to doctor parents. The loss of his father at a young age traumatized him. That, coupled with physical ailments, bewildered him. These events also made him appreciative of even minor joys.

His Mother encouraged him and hard work enabled life to get on track again. When it was time to decide the course of his life, he was in no doubt, he wanted to don a white coat. He started his career by completing his MBBS and MS. Later on, he was admitted to MCh in plastic surgery and thus became a certified sculptor of humans. Currently, he is practicing Laser cosmetic surgery at Elina Aesthetic and Laser Clinic in Ludhiana. His wife is an anesthesiologist and they have a son and a daughter.

Education 
He did his schooling in KVM School and later joined for the MBBS course at Dayanand Medical College, Ludhiana. He did M. S. in surgery at the same institution. After working as a surgeon for five years, he did his super-specialization (MCh) in plastic surgery and joined Safdarjang Hospital at New Delhi. Later, he worked in hospitals at Michigan the United States, Chandigarh and Ludhiana.

Publications 
He has presented papers on plastic and cosmetic surgery at various conferences and his work has been published in national and international journals. He received the ‘Best Paper Award’ at the annual conference of the Association of Plastic Surgeons of India in Lucknow in September 1997.
International 
1.	The osseofasciocutaneous flap: A new method to transfer fibula along with a sufficient amount of skin. British Journal of Plastic Surgery 2002; 55(4):312-19.
2.	Large transverse fasciocutaneous leg flap: whole leg flap. British Journal of Plastic Surgery 2000, 53:495-98.
National
1.	 Role of nasogastric tube following release of post burn contracture of neck and split skin grafting. Indian Journal of Burns 1998, 6:60–63

Professional affiliations
He is a member of

 APSI – Association of Plastic Surgeons of India IMA -Indian Medical Association

About the Book 
Dr Jas Kohli has authored the novel "Anything to Look Hot" which was first released in October 2015. It is a fictional book which is based on the experiences of a plastic surgeon. It describes the journey of the protagonist, Dr Dhruv from the days of his training to his stint in Bollywood where he shapes the movie stars and is full of humour, drama and action. The novel has been published by Srishti publishers and has been received well.

Synopsis – Anything to Look Hot
Dr Dhruv, a surgeon named after the pole star, is a surprise topper in the entrance test for a degree in plastic surgery. But he is aware that he has to work hard like a husky and brook insults like a donkey for the next two years as a resident doctor. His chief initially mocks at him publicly but Dhruv gradually wins his confidence. Each day of his residency is exciting as he comes face to face with many piquant characters and situations. He also takes fancy to Nandini, a ravishing junior doctor from Assam, and has a wobbly romantic journey before ensnaring her in matrimony. However, their togetherness is short-lived because she has to leave for Assam after selection in the MD course. After passing his exam, he gains a fellowship in a cosmetic surgery hospital in the US where he finds out that humour is a great leveller.  After coming back, Dhruv is all set to lead a run of the mill life in his hometown Delhi. His mom reveals a family secret about the unfulfilled wish of his dad who, in his youth, badly wanted to leave Delhi to try out his luck in Hindi film industry but could not do so because of family responsibilities. This sparks Bollywood dreams in him and he takes the train to Mumbai on a mad mission to knife as many stars as possible, in the operation theatre of course. He joins a renowned plastic surgeon Dr Jayaraj where he learns about the special skills required to deal with the film stars and other celebrities who are the major chunk of Dr Jayaraj's clientele. In a surprise turn of events, Dr Jayaraj opts to settle in Dubai. Dhruv reluctantly takes over his practice. His career takes off after he takes up the challenge of radical transformation of looks of a gossip columnist, Chitra, by doing three marathon surgeries. Chitra's relative, Shagun, an aspiring actor, wants her vital statistics to be top heavy. Dhruv fulfills her wish by doing breast implants. Meanwhile, his wife finishes her MD and joins him in Mumbai. Soon they have a daughter. Dhruv has by now made a good name and lot of actors, come to him. On the flip side, he has to handle not only big-headed stars but also fraudulent colleagues who go for his jugular. Shagun also brings along her boyfriend who gives him an offer to be an actor but Dhruv puts it in cold storage. Instead, he plans to orchestrate his dad's entry into showbiz. His father gets a stellar role in a television serial and shifts to Mumbai. There is an exciting interlude in his life, when one of his patients, who is a model, invades his mind space. Just when both of them seem to be going beyond the point of no return, a whistleblower nips the affair in the bud. Dhruv immerses himself in his work as he becomes the demanded one. But ignoring his back pain proves to be his nemesis as it precipitates as disc prolapse.  He is advised total bed rest and surgery is not ruled out. An escape route via an acting career is proposed again.  However his chief Dr Vidur motivates him to fight back and not to give up plastic surgery. After the period of bed rest his problem subsides to a great extent and he escapes surgical intervention. Meanwhile, to his profound delight, his dad switches to big screen, bagging a lead role. .

See also 
 Indian English literature

References 

Living people
Novelists from Punjab, India
Indian male novelists
English-language writers from India
20th-century Indian novelists
Writers from Ludhiana
20th-century Indian male writers
Year of birth missing (living people)